This is a list of bridges and other crossings of the Black Warrior River from its confluence at the Tombigbee River near Demopolis upstream to its source at the confluence of the Mulberry and Locust forks in Jefferson County, Alabama.

Crossings

References
 Bridge Tables from the U.S. Army Corps of Engineers

Black Warrior River
Crossings